The kri-kri (Capra hircus cretica), sometimes called the Cretan goat, Agrimi, or Cretan Ibex, is a feral goat inhabiting the Eastern Mediterranean, previously considered a subspecies of wild goat. The kri-kri today is found only in Greece on three small islands just off the shore of Crete      (Dia, Thodorou and Agii Pantes).  The kri-kri can also be found on the island of Sapientza ( Messenian Oinousses ) which was brought to the island in great numbers, in order to protect the species from extinction. 

The kri-kri has a light brownish coat with a darker band around its neck. It has two horns that sweep back from the head. In the wild they are shy and avoid humans, resting during the day. The animal can leap some distance or climb seemingly sheer cliffs.

The kri-kri is not thought to be indigenous to Crete, most likely having been imported to the island during the time of the Minoan civilization.It was once common throughout the Aegean but the peaks of the 2,400 m (8,000 ft) White Mountains of Western Crete are their last strongholds—particularly a series of almost vertical 900 m (3,000 ft) cliffs called 'the Untrodden'—at the head of the Samaria Gorge. This mountain range, which hosts another 14 endemic animal species, is protected as a UNESCO Biosphere Reserve. In total, their range extends to the White Mountains, the Samaria National Forest and the islets of Dia, Thodorou, and Agii Pandes. Recently some were introduced onto two more islands.

By 1960, the kri-kri was under threat, with a population below 200. It had been the only meat available to mountain guerillas during the German occupation in World War II. Its status was one reasons why the Samaria Gorge became a national park in 1962. There are still only about 2,000 animals on the island and they are considered vulnerable: hunters still seek them for their tender meat, grazing grounds have become scarcer and disease has affected them. Hybridization is also a threat, as the population has interbred with ordinary goats. Hunting them is strictly prohibited.

Archaeological excavations have unearthed several depictions of the kri-kri. Some academics believe that the animal was worshiped during antiquity. On the island, males are often called 'agrimi' (i.e. 'the wild one'), while the name 'sanada' is used for the female. The kri-kri is a symbol of the island, much used in tourism marketing and official literature.

As molecular analyses demonstrate, the kri-kri is not, as previously thought, a distinct subspecies of wild goat. Rather, it is a feral domestic goat, derived from the first stocks of goats domesticated in the Levant and other parts of the Eastern Mediterranean around 8000-7500 BCE. Therefore, it represents a nearly ten-thousand-year-old "snapshot" of the first domestication of goats.

See also
 Sapientza
 Feral goats
 European mouflon
 Auckland Island Pig, redomesticated pig population
 Campbell Island cattle, exterminated feral cattle population
 Chillingham Cattle and White Park, culturally significant (semi-)feral cattle populations

References 

Bar-Gal, G. K. et al. (2002): Genetic evidence for the origin of the agrimi goat (Capra aegagrus cretica). Journal of Zoology 256:369-377. DOI:10.1017/S0952836902000407
Manceau, V. et al. (1999): Systematics of the genus Capra inferred from mitochondrial DNA sequence data. Molecular Phylogenetics and Evolution 13:504-510

Goats
Feral goats
Capra (genus)
Goat breeds
Mammals of Europe
Endemic fauna of Crete
Subspecies